Player escort (also called match mascot or child mascot (plural is mascot children)) is a child who accompanies a football player entering the pitch. Player escorts hold hands with the footballer while they walk in and stay with the player during the playing of the national anthem. The children are usually between 6 and 18 years old. In addition to assisting players, they often have duties such as carrying flags, helping the sideline ball crew and playing matches with each other.

There are various reasons why players walk in with children. These include promoting children rights campaigns, bringing the element of innocence to the game, fulfilling children dreams or making profit of it, and reminding players that children are looking up to them.

History
Children have appeared with football players at least since the 1990s either as one mascot for each team or one for every player. These children typically get chosen when they play little leagues and perform outstanding jobs. 

The UEFA Euro 2000 was one of the first major events where player escorts appeared with every footballer, replacing the previous practice where the players on the team linked arms with each other. In club games children are usually members of youth teams or contest winners. Since 2002, World Cup or European Championship escorts are selected in a competition hosted by McDonald's, sponsor of the event. 

Being a child mascot may or may not be free. Among FA Premier League clubs, some may charge £350-£600 depending on the fixture while others offer some free places through competitions and charities, and other clubs do not have a charge at all.

On some occasions, there can be special escorts. For example, Ajax Amsterdam players walked out with their mothers on Mother's Day and São Paulo FC players walked out with dogs to raise awareness to stray dogs problem. Some famous players like Wayne Rooney used to be player escorts in their childhood.

References

External links

Terminology used in multiple sports
Association football terminology
Rugby league terminology
Rugby union terminology
Sports fandom
Children's sport
Association football supporters
Volunteering